Longsha District is a district of the city of Qiqihar, Heilongjiang, People's Republic of China.

Administrative subdivisions 
Longsha District is divided into 7 subdistricts. 
7 subdistricts
Wulong Subdistrict
Hubin Subdistrict
Jiang'an Subdistrict 
Zhengyang Subdistrict 
Caihong Subdistrict
Nanhang Subdistrict
Damin Subdistrict

References

Districts of Qiqihar